In meteorology, haar or sea fret is a cold sea fog.  It occurs most often on the east coast of Great Britain between April and September, when warm air passes over the cold North Sea. The term is also known as harr, hare, harl, har and hoar.

Causes
Haar is typically formed over the sea and is blown to the land by the wind. This commonly occurs when warmer moist air moves over the relatively cooler North Sea causing the moisture in the air to condense, forming haar.

Sea breezes and easterly winds then bring the haar into the east coast of Scotland and North-East England where it can continue for several miles inland.  This can be common in the UK summer when heating of the land creates a sea breeze, bringing haar in from the sea and as a result can significantly reduce temperatures compared to those just a few miles inland.

Nomenclature
The term haar is used along certain lands bordering the North Sea, primarily eastern  Scotland and the north-east of England. Variants of the term in Scots and northern English include har, hare, harl, harr and hoar. Its origin is related to Middle Dutch haren, referring to a cold, sharp wind. In Yorkshire and Northumberland it is commonly referred to as a sea fret.

References

Environment of Scotland
Fog
Scottish coast
Climate of Scotland
North Sea
Scots language
Scottish words and phrases